Singularity is a Big Finish Productions audio drama based on the long-running British science fiction television series Doctor Who.

Plot
In Moscow in the near future, the Fifth Doctor and Turlough come across a conspiracy involving the Somnus Foundation that will cause the course of history as it should be to change.

Cast
The Doctor — Peter Davison
Turlough — Mark Strickson
Qel — Eve Polycarpou
Seo — Maitland Chandler
Cord — Michael Cuckson
Lena Korolev — Natasha Radski
Alexi Korolev — Oleg Mirochnikov
Pavel Fedorin — Max Bollinger
Natalia Pushkin — Dominika Boon
Tev — Billy Miller
Xen — Marq English

Notes
This release had a limited edition second variant cover designed by Stuart Manning. This was exclusive to sci-fi store 10th Planet.

External links
Big Finish Productions – Singularity

2005 audio plays
Fifth Doctor audio plays